The Andaman drongo (Dicrurus andamanensis) is a species of bird in the family Dicruridae. The species is endemic to the Andaman Islands of the Indian Ocean. There are two subspecies, the nominate race being found across the main islands of the archipelago, and the race dicruriformis occurring on Great Coco Island and Table Island in the north of the chain.

The Andaman drongo is 28–29 cm long, although the larger dicruriformis subspecies is 35 cm in length. It has a deeply forked tail and a heavy black bill. The plumage is black (except for brownish primaries), and glossed with green. There is some sexual dimorphism, with the female being smaller and having a less forked tail. 
 
Its natural habitats are subtropical or tropical moist lowland forest and subtropical or tropical moist montane forest.
It is threatened by habitat loss.

References

Andaman drongo
Birds of the Andaman Islands
Birds of Myanmar
Andaman drongo
Andaman drongo
Taxonomy articles created by Polbot